Erlian may refer to:
 Erlian, an alternative name for Erenhot, a city in Inner Mongolia in China.
 King Erlian, a fictional character in The Chronicles of Narnia.